Benjamin Neil Reeves (born 19 November 1991) is a professional footballer who plays as a midfielder for League Two club Gillingham. Born in England, he has been capped twice for the Northern Ireland national team.

Club career

Southampton
Having started out in the youth team as a left back, he was later converted into an attacking midfielder. On 5 April 2011, Reeves signed his first professional contract on a two-year deal.

On 21 September 2011, he made his debut for Southampton, playing the full 90 minutes in the League Cup third round match against Preston North End. He set up the first goal in a 2–1 win. At the start of the 2012–13 season, Reeves scored his first goal for Southampton against Stevenage in the League Cup on 28 August 2012. He made his Premier League debut as a substitute in a 3–1 defeat against Everton at Goodison Park on 29 September.

On 4 June 2013, at the end of the 2012–13 season, Reeves was released by Southampton.

Dagenham & Redbridge (loan)
He joined Dagenham & Redbridge on a month's loan on 23 February 2012, making his debut for the club two days later, in a 0–0 draw against Plymouth Argyle. Reeves made five appearances before returning to his parent club.

Southend (loan)
After six first-team appearances for the Saints in 2012–13, on 31 January 2013 Reeves joined Southend United on loan for a month. He scored his first goal for the club on 12 February, in a 2–1 defeat at home to Cheltenham Town. Eight days later, Reeves scored his second goal for the club, in the last minutes of the Football League Trophy Southern Area Final, as Southend beat Leyton Orient 3–2 on aggregate, to send the club to the final.

On 15 March 2013, it was announced that Reeves had re-joined Southend United on loan, until the end of the season, in his second spell at the club. Reeves played his first match in his second loan spell, providing an assist for Freddy Eastwood, in a 1–1 draw against Torquay United. Reeves played in the final of the Football League Trophy against Crewe, where he came on as a substitute for Bilel Mohsni in the 57th minute, as Southend lost 2–0.

Milton Keynes Dons
On 13 July 2013, Reeves signed for Milton Keynes Dons on a one-year contract.

2013–14 season
After appearing on the bench in the opening game of the season against Shrewsbury Town, Reeves scored on his debut in the first round of the League Cup, with a 2–1 victory over Northampton Town. Three days later, Reeves made his league debut for the club, playing as a left-back, in a 1–0 win over Crewe. After appearing on the bench throughout August and September, Reeves played in an unusual position as a striker when he scored his league goal of the season, in a 3–2 win over Rotherham United on 19 October 2013. December saw Reeves scored three against Dover Athletic in the second league round of FA Cup and then followed up, scoring two league goals against Wolverhampton Wanderers and Port Vale. January then saw Reeves scored three goals, including twice against Wigan Athletic and Bristol City. Reeves later scored two league goals in February against Walsall and Oldham Athletic Unfortunately, Reeves suffered a hamstring injury that kept him out for two games and scored on his return from injury, in a 1–0 win over Stevenage on 22 March 2014 (which later earned him award for March's Goal of the Month). However, his return was short-lived when he suffered ankle ligament damage that saw him out for the remainder of the 2013–14 season.

Despite this, Reeves won four award (includes Player of the Year, Players' Player of the Year, MKDSA Player of the Year and Goal of the Year) at the club's award ceremony, as well as, included for the LKO Team of the Season. Not only that, the club opted to take up their option of a contract extension that would ensure Reeves remained under contract for the 2014–15 season. Reeves finished his first season at Milton Keynes Dons, making thirty-five appearances and scoring eleven times in all competitions.

2014–15 season
At the start of the 2014–15 season, Reeves returned from injury and resumed pre-season training. At the beginning of July, Reeves signed a contract extension, keeping him at the Dons until 2016.

It took until 13 September 2014 for Reeves score his first goal of the 2014–15 season, in a 5–3 win over Barnsley, which he followed up by scoring seven days later, in a 6–1 win over Crewe. His third goal later came on 29 November 2014, in a 6–0 win over Colchester United. Reeves was out throughout December when he suffered a hamstring injury.

After appearing two games in mid-January, Reeves was again out injured but returned from the sidelines to score in a 4–2 win over Gillingham on 14 February 2015, followed up scoring twice seven days later, in a 3–0 win over Peterborough United, which earned him Man of the Match award for his good performance. Then on 17 March 2015, Reeves scored his seventh goal of the season, in a 3–1 win over Oldham Athletic.

However, Reeves suffered a calf problem while on international duty, resulting in him initially being ruled out for the remainder of the 2014–15 season. Despite this, Reeves returned to full training in early-May, and made his return to the first team, where he came on as a substitute for Samir Carruthers in the 73rd minute, and set up the fifth goal for Dean Lewington, in a 5–1 win over Yeovil Town on the final day of the season to earn their first promotion to the Championship. His second season saw Reeves make thirty-six appearances and score seven times in all competitions.

2015–16 season
Reeves played his first Championship game in the opening match of the 2015–16 season, where he set up a goal for Dean Bowditch, in a 4–1 win over Rotherham United. Three days after that, Reeves signed a contract extension with the club, keeping him at the Dons until 2017. However, on 21 August,  Reeves suffered a hamstring injury, which he sustained during a match against Preston North End which ruled him out for a month.

He made his return to the side on 19 September when he came on as a substitute in a 2–1 defeat by Leeds United. Reeves scored twice against Blackburn Rovers on 17 October, helping his team to a 3–0 victory, their first in the league since mid-August.

Charlton Athletic
On 3 August 2017, Reeves signed for League One side Charlton Athletic on a two-year contract., rejoining his former manager, Karl Robinson. He scored his first goal for Charlton in an EFL Trophy tie against Crawley Town on 29 August 2017. He was released by Charlton at the end of the 2018–19 season.

Milton Keynes Dons (second spell)
On 1 August 2019, Reeves returned to Milton Keynes Dons on a free transfer for a second spell having spent much of pre-season training with the club. Despite enjoying a mostly injury-free season, Reeves was one of nine players released from the club at the conclusion of the campaign. In August 2020 he was on trial at Plymouth Argyle.

Plymouth Argyle
On 3 September 2020, Reeves signed for League One club Plymouth Argyle having spent a week on trial. He scored his first goal for Plymouth on 10 November 2020 in an EFL Trophy group game against Newport County.

Gillingham 
Following his release from Plymouth at the conclusion of the 2020–21 season, Reeves signed for fellow League One side Gillingham.

International career
Reeves received his first international call-up for Northern Ireland in February 2014, qualifying as his grandparents hail from Fermanagh. He made his debut on 14 October 2014, when he came on as a substitute in a Euro 2016 qualifier match against Greece, described as "a high-pressure debut".

Career statistics

Honours
Milton Keynes Dons
Football League One runner-up: 2014–15

Charlton Athletic
EFL League One play-offs: 2018–19

Individual
Milton Keynes Dons Player of the Year: 2013–14
Milton Keynes Dons Player's Player of the Year: 2013–14

References

External links

Ben Reeves at My Football Data

1991 births
Living people
Footballers from Dorset
English footballers
English people of Northern Ireland descent
Association footballers from Northern Ireland
Northern Ireland international footballers
Association football midfielders
Southampton F.C. players
Southend United F.C. players
Dagenham & Redbridge F.C. players
Milton Keynes Dons F.C. players
Plymouth Argyle F.C. players
Charlton Athletic F.C. players
Gillingham F.C. players
English Football League players
Premier League players